Frauensee is a village and a former municipality in the Wartburgkreis district of Thuringia, Germany. Since July 2018, it is part of the town Bad Salzungen.

Geography

The countryside around Frauensee is dominated by the Frauensee Forest (Frauenseer Forst) with its kuppen, hills and high points, including the:   Lehnberg , Gertenberg, Buchenberg, Schälrück and  Langer Rück. The Schafberg is located right on the edge of Frauensee.

The region is part of the Frauensee Hills (Frauenseer Hügelland) and forms the northern part of the Salzungen Werra Upland. It is located right (north and east) of the Werra roughly in the triangle formed by Bad Salzungen, Philippsthal and Berka. It is part of the East Hesse Highlands

References

Former municipalities in Thuringia
Wartburgkreis